Peter Child Bacon (November 11, 1804 – February 7, 1886) was an attorney who served as the third Mayor of Worcester, Massachusetts, USA.

Biography
Bacon was born on November 11, 1804. He graduated from Brown University in 1827. Bacon studied law at the New Haven Law School, and with the law firm of Davis & Allen of Worcester.

In 1839, Bacon was admitted the bar at Worcester, County. He practiced law for two years in Dudley, Massachusetts and twelve years in Oxford, Massachusetts after which he moved to Worcester.

He was elected a member of the American Antiquarian Society in 1860.

Notes

1804 births
1886 deaths
People from Dudley, Massachusetts
Brown University alumni
Massachusetts lawyers
Massachusetts Free Soilers
People from Oxford, Massachusetts
Mayors of Worcester, Massachusetts
Members of the American Antiquarian Society
19th-century American lawyers